The Women's 200m T11 had its first round held on September 15, beginning at 11:26 and the A and B Finals were held on September 16 at 17:25.

Medalists

Results

References
Round 1 - Heat 1
Round 1 - Heat 2
Round 1 - Heat 3
Final A
Final B

Athletics at the 2008 Summer Paralympics
2008 in women's athletics